Sleepwalkers is a compilation album by David Sylvian, released September 2010 by Samadhi Sound.

Content and reception 
The album is a compilation of some of Sylvian's collaborations from the 2000s, and includes several tracks remixed by Sylvian as well as alternate takes. "Sleepwalkers" and "The World is Everything" appeared on a sampler CD that was included with a limited tour brochure from Sylvian's 'The World is Everything' tour in 2007. "World Citizen – I Won't Be Disappointed" with Ryuichi Sakamoto originally appeared on the 2003 EP World Citizen. However, the version on Sleepwalkers is the 'looped piano' version found on Sakamoto's 2004 album Chasm. "Five Lines" is the only new track on the album and is a collaboration with Dai Fujikura who went on to remix and influence several songs on the subsequent album Died in the Wool – Manafon Variations. The final track, "Trauma", is the only instrumental song and had been included as a bonus track to Sylvian's 2003 album Blemish.

Thom Jurek for AllMusic described the album as "provocative and compelling listen, full of moods, shapes, colors, spaces, and textures. Sylvian has created (aestehtically at least) something approaching an entirely new offering from various chapters in his recent musical past." Jess Harvell for Pitchfork wrote that Sylvian's "fearlessness, if not quite his versatility, at tackling new sounds (and even new structures) is still a beacon, especially at an age when many of his contemporaries have fossilized into post-punk heritage acts."

In June 2022, the album was reissued  in Europe by Grönland Records. It was released on CD as well as for the first time as a double LP. It feature three new tracks: "World Citizen" a collaboration with Ryuichi Sakamoto originally released on the EP of the same name alongside "World Citizen (I Won't Be Disappointed)" (which is included on both the 2010 and 2022 tracklists); "Do You Know Me Now?", solely by Sylvian, which had been released as a non-album single in 2013; and "Modern Interior", a collaboration with Jan Bang that had been written  and released in 2011 for the Kizunaworld Project, which was to support those affected by the Tōhoku earthquake and tsunami earlier that year. However, two tracks, "Ballad of a Deadman" and "Playground Martyrs", both collaborations with Sylvian's brother Steve Jansen, were removed from the reissue.

Track listing

Personnel 

Musicians
 David Sylvian – vocals (1–15), keyboards (1, 7, 11), guitars (2, 3, 11, 16), harmonica (2), electric piano (2), electronics (16)
 Martin Brandlmayr – drums (1), vibraphone (1), marimba (1), computer (1)
 Toshimaru Nakamura – no-input mixing board (1)
 Sachiko M – sampler with sine waves (1)
 Burnt Friedman – drums (2), programming (2, 7), synthesisers (2, 7), vocoder (7)
 Hayden Chisholm – clarinet (2, 7)
 Morten Grønvad – vibraphone (2, 7)
 Daniel Schröter – double bass (2)
 Atom™ – drum programming (2)
 Tommy Blaize – backing vocals (2, 7)
 Derek Green – backing vocals (2)
 Beverlei Brown – backing vocals (2, 7)
 Andrea Grant – backing vocals (2)
 Joan Wasser – vocals (3), violin (3)
 Theo Travis – flute (3)
 Steve Jansen – drums (3, 7, 11), percussion (3, 7), synthesizers (3, 8), sampling (3, 8, 11), keyboards (7, 11), piano (8)
 Jan Bang – live sampling (4), samples (4, 14)
 Erik Honoré – synthesisers (4)
 Arve Henriksen – trumpet (4, 14)

 Audun Kleive – percussion (4, 14)
 Ingebrigt Håker Flaten – double bass (4)
 Ryuichi Sakamoto – keyboards (5), sound programming (5)
 Sketch Show – sound programming (5)
 Amadeo Pace – electric guitar (5)
 Keigo Oyamada – turntable (CDJ-800) (5)
 Jennifer Curtis – violin (6)
 Michi Wiancko – violin (6)
 Wendy Richman – viola (6)
 Katinka Kleijn – cello (6)
 Keith Lowe – bass (7), double bass (11)
 Tim Motzer – acoustic guitar (7)
 Joseph Suchy – electric guitar (7)
 Thomas Hass – saxophone (7)
 Takagi Masakatsu – all instrumentation (9)
 Chris Vrenna – all instrumentation (10)
 Stina Nordenstam – vocals (11)
 Christian Fennesz – all instrumentation (12)
 Takuma Watanabe – keyboards (13)
 Eivind Aarset – guitar (14)
 Jean-Philippe Verdin – all instrumentation (15)

Technical
 David Sylvian – producer (1, 2, 6, 7, 11, 13, 16), mixing (1, 2, 6, 7, 11, 13, 16), remixing (3, 8–10), art direction, compilation producer
 Martin Brandlmayr – producer (1)
 Burnt Friedman – producer (2, 7)
 Steve Jansen – producer (3, 8, 11), strings arrangement (3, 8), mixing (7, 11)
 Jan Bang – producer (4, 14), mixing (4, 14), arrangement (14)
 Erik Honoré – producer (4, 14), mixing (4, 14)
 Ryuichi Sakamoto – producer (5), mixing (5)
 Fernando Aponte – mixing (5)
 Dai Fujikura – orchestration (6), conducting (6)
 Takagi Masakatsu – producer (9)
 Chris Vrenna – producer (10), mixing (10)
 Christian Fennesz – producer (12), mixing (12)
 Takuma Watanabe – producer (13)
 Jean-Philippe Verdin – producer (15), mixing (15)
 Tony Cousins – mastering at Metropolis Studios
 Kristamas Klousch – cover, artwork
 Chris Bigg – design

Charts

References 

2010 compilation albums
David Sylvian compilation albums
Samadhi Sound albums